Spare Parts is a Big Finish Productions audio drama based on the long-running British science fiction television series Doctor Who.

Spare Parts was partially adapted into the television episodes "Rise of the Cybermen" and "The Age of Steel" although, in actuality, the two stories bear little resemblance to each other.

Synopsis
The Doctor and Nyssa arrive on a frozen planet, in a city where cybernetic implants are all that is keeping the population from death. The Doctor knows this planet all too well, and refuses to interfere in events that will become the birth of the Cybermen.

Cast
The Doctor — Peter Davison
Nyssa — Sarah Sutton
Yvonne Hartley — Kathryn Guck
Dad — Paul Copley
Thomas Dodd — Derren Nesbitt
Sisterman Constant — Pamela Binns
Frank Hartley — Jim Hartley
Mrs Ginsberg — Ann Jenkins
Doctorman Allan — Sally Knyvette
Zheng — Nicholas Briggs

Uncredited:
Citizen 1 – Marc Platt
Cybermen – Nicholas Briggs
Radio Announcer – Nicholas Briggs
Citizen 2 – Nicholas Briggs
Nurse – Nicholas Briggs
The Minister – Alistair Lock
TV Commentator – Alistair Lock
Crewman Philpott – Gary Russell
Nurse – Gary Russell

Plot
A radio announcer declares that after six years training Crewman Donald Philpott will become the first human to set foot on the surface of Mondas since the inhabitants were forced to retreat underground.  Once Philpott emerges, however, his heartbeat and breathing increase rapidly until, screaming, he is overcome by the vastness of the universe.  Months or years later, the Doctor and Nyssa have arrived in what strongly resembles a 1950s London street, but in a huge cavern.  They separate to explore.  Nyssa encounters Mr Hartley, a Mat-catcher who traps wild Cybermats, and his daughter Yvonne.  With curfew approaching, they insist on taking Nyssa home with them.  Meanwhile, the Doctor finds his way into the shop of Thomas Dodd, a dealer in human body parts for transplant.  Dodd confirms the Doctor’s suspicion that the planet he has landed on is indeed Mondas, and explains that the population is down to a few thousand in a single underground city.  Mondas has drifted so far from any star that the surface is no longer habitable.  The Doctor intends to return to the TARDIS, but Dodd tries to stop him as curfew has fallen.  Outside the shop they encounter a cybernetic Policeman, a primitive cyborg, similar to but not yet as advanced as a Cyberman, who tries to arrest them for breaking curfew.  The Doctor and Dodd flee.  Back at the Hartley’s, Yvonne, her father and Nyssa discover Sisterman Constant, a medical official who works as a Selector, is visiting. She is choosing candidates to become Crewmen (i.e. Cybermen), to work on the propulsion system on the surface of the planet.  Constant is highly suspicious of Nyssa, and later reports the stranger’s presence to her superiors.  Elsewhere, the Doctor and Dodd are puzzled by heavy traffic movement.  After climbing the tower of the abandoned Church of Former-Day Souls they discover the Police are digging up the graveyard for body parts.  They are attacked by a Policeman, who the Doctor kills by pushing it into the church clock mechanism.  He then sets the bell tolling, summoning the population.  He hopes that, when they discover what is going on, the people will force the government to change the direction of their work, thus stopping the development of the Cybermen.  At the Hartley’s a Police squad arrive in search of Nyssa.  She flees, after Yvonne gives Nyssa her pet Cybermat, Matty, as a present.  Meanwhile, the Central Committee have decided that the Doctor and Nyssa must be found and eliminated as insurgents.

Reunited, the Doctor and Nyssa argue over what to do.  Nyssa believes that they should intervene to stop the creation of the Cybermen.  The Doctor maintains that they must not interfere – he hopes that his ‘wake-up call’ with the church bell will be sufficient to make the Mondasians change their own future.  However, the Police have used force to crush the unrest.  In any case, the TARDIS is trapped as Matty has escaped and severed the energy conduit in the console.  At the Committee Palace hospital ward, Doctorman Allan, the Surgeon-General of Mondas and chief medical officer in charge of the Cyberman programme, is becoming increasingly cynical about the project.  She is short of resources, and most of the Cybermen survive barely a week as their bodies' immune systems reject the cybernetic implants.  Meanwhile, Frank, Yvonne’s brother, arrives at the TARDIS and tells Nyssa that Yvonne has received her call-up papers – in other words, she has been taken to be converted into a Cyberman.  The Doctor leaves to make another attempt to stir up insurrection, causing a truck-load of bones from the graveyard to lose its load in public.  The Committee decide to summon Commander Zheng, the leading Cyberman, from the surface to restore order.  The Doctor approaches Dodd, hoping he knows a way into the Committee Palace, but Dodd – planning to steal the Doctor’s undamaged body-parts – locks him in his freezer.  However, a security Cybermat has observed the Doctor at Dodd’s shop, and a squad of Policemen arrive.  They intend to kill the Doctor, but Allan stops them, taking him and Dodd into her own custody in the belief that the Doctor could prove useful.  At the home of the Hartleys, Nyssa observes the new ‘Crewmen’ being paraded on television, and is horrified to see that they are fully processed Cybermen.  However, a sudden power-failure throughout the city causes mass panic.  The latest batch of Cybermen, including Yvonne, become out-of-control as the systems have shut down before processing was complete.  The Doctor realises that Mondas is entering the Cherrybowl Nebula, a large tract of unstable Space, with the result that the destruction of Mondas is imminent.

Debris caused by planetary-wide turbulence crushes the Police Escort of the Doctor and Dodd, allowing them to escape into the shelter of the Palace.  There, Constant is attempting to restrain the half-processed Cybermen, but one of them – Yvonne – has escaped.  Allan goes to try to restore power to the Central Committee.  She encounters the Doctor – Dodd having run off in terror – who offers to help.  As they are searching for a way to restore power to the City, the Doctor discovers the truth behind the Committee: twenty of Mondas’s finest thinkers permanently plugged into a giant computer.  Back in the hospital ward, one of the semi-processed Cybermen, wrongly believing that Constant is withholding important data, attacks her.  However, Commander Zheng arrives and kills the rogue Crewman.  His squad take the semi-processed Cybermen into custody until processing can be completed, and sends an appalled Constant to be cyber-converted as a way of ‘healing’ the injuries caused by her attacker.  He then goes to consult with the Committee, and oversees the Doctor’s and Allan’s attempts to restore power.  As the Doctor closes the final circuit Zheng reactivates the power before the Doctor is clear, apparently killing him.  At the Hartley apartment, a distressed Yvonne forces her way in, the remnant of her humanity reminding her that she wanted her father to see her in her ‘uniform’ before she joined the work crews.  Mr Hartley, Frank and Nyssa are horrified when they realise who the Cyberman is.  However, with the power back on the processing automatically starts to complete.  Away from the hospital support, Yvonne’s body is unable to cope and she dies.  Shortly afterwards a Policeman arrives and arrests Nyssa.  Meanwhile, the Doctor has recovered consciousness.  Allan is astonished by his physical resilience, surviving an electric shock from generators big enough to power several cities, and is convinced he is the solution to the destabilising Cybermen.  A scan reveals that the Doctor has an additional lobe to his brain, not present in humans, which deals with all bodily functions.  Allan realises she can reproduce this in all future Cybermen, which will prevent their bodies rejecting the cybernetic implants.  The Committee instructs her to proceed, declaring that from now on the Cybermen will be invincible.

As the Doctor is prepared for a scan to produce the necessary template for the new Cybermen, the Committee decides, in spite of Zheng’s doubts, that the entire population must be processed.  To achieve maximum efficiency, the Committee abandons all remnants of individuality and adopts a single persona, the ‘Cyberplanner’.  Meanwhile, a shocked Allan protests at the plan to convert all Mondasians, but Zheng, obeying the Cyberplanner’s instructions, relieves her of her duties and takes command himself.  However, Zheng is increasingly doubtful of the Cyberplanner’s intentions.  His Cybermen have been building a propulsion unit on the surface of Mondas capable of sending the planet on a reverse trajectory out of the Cherrybowl Nebula.  The Cyberplanner, though, is insisting that the power necessary to operate the propulsion unit must be directed into processing the population.  A large force of Cybermen is despatched to herd the populace – including Mr Hartley and Frank – into the Palace for conversion.  They resist at first, but the turbulence caused by entering the Nebula is causing the cavern ceiling to start to collapse, and the Hartleys flee inside for safety. Back in the hospital ward the Doctor has vanished.  Believing the Doctor has been tricked, Nyssa is appalled to be confronted by a Cyberman which she believes to be him.  However, the Doctor reappears, and Allan reveals that the Cyberman is actually Thomas Dodd.  Realising that every Cyberman he has ever met or ever will meet is based on himself the Doctor is more determined than ever to stop them.  The Palace still has a large wine cellar, and the Doctor decides to pour the wine into the nutrient vats which feed the Cyberplanner, causing it to malfunction.  Allan goes to warn the Cyberplanner, but Zheng intervenes, finally having decided that the safety of the planet takes priority over the safety of its government.  Another Cyberman tries to stop the Doctor and Nyssa, but the Hartleys, having escaped, attack the cyborg and throw it into the nutrient vat.  Zheng and Allan arrive in the Committee Chamber.  The Cyberplanner refuses to believe the nutrients have been poisoned, and Allan is taken away to be processed whilst Zheng argues with the Cyberplanner.  As Zheng moves to activate the propulsion unit the Cyberplanner shoots him.  Elsewhere, the Hartleys realise that they can convert the generators into a giant ‘cheeser’ – a device to attract Cybermats – causing a massive swarm which will attack the Cyberplanner.  They complete their work but are captured and sent for processing.  To give them time, the Doctor had also allowed himself to be captured and taken before the Cyberplanner.  Thanks to its slipping faculties (caused by the wine), the Doctor is able to engage the Cyberplanner in a discussion on Mondasian history, delaying it until the Cybermats arrive.  When they do, the swarm kills the Cyberplanner, allowing the dying Zheng to activate the propulsion unit.  Some time later, the Doctor and Nyssa leave, believing that, whilst they have not stopped the Cybermen, they have redirected their evolution into something good. Mr Hartley has been put in charge of reconstructing the ceiling, with the work carried out by Cybermen.  Processing has been halted, and the Doctor has provided Allan with instructions on how to partially reverse the conversion.  As she works at her desk, however, assisted by the Cyberman version of Constant, Zheng – who she believed dead – walks in and announces, “Doctorman Allan.  We begin again.”

Production

Marc Platt was reluctant to write a Cyberman story, as he felt their plausibility as a convincing villain over the history of the series had declined too markedly.  However, he realised that by writing an origin story, he could go right back to the basics of what the Cybermen had originally been intended to be by Kit Pedler, which he felt were a far scarier concept than the later incarnations.

Platt was determined that the story should be a tragedy.  Unlike the Daleks, which were aliens driven by Nazi-like beliefs, the Mondasians were very much human.  Spare Parts thus became a story of how humans could become so desperate that they would reject their humanity – even their emotions – to survive.

Because of these close links to the original concept for the Cybermen, there are various references to the first Cyberman story, The Tenth Planet.  The sing-song voices of the Cybermen are the same as used in that episode, and references to cloth masks indicate that they are the same design of Cyberman.  The Cyberplanner expands on the brief description of Mondasian history in the television story.  Marc Platt has stated that Eric Krailford, mentioned several times though never appearing, is intended to be the human who will eventually become Cyberman Krail from The Tenth Planet.  The death of Adric in Earthshock, indirectly caused by the Cybermen, is alluded to several times.  The concept of a planetary propulsion unit on the surface of Mondas was derived from Attack of the Cybermen.

Roger Lloyd-Pack was originally approached to play Mr Hartley, but was unable to.  Eventually he was cast as the creator of the alternate universe Cybermen in "Rise of the Cybermen".  Pamela Binns agreed to play Sisterman Constant partly because she rarely had the chance to play villains.  Constant is not strictly a villain, but certainly not wholly on the side of good (at least from the Doctor’s point of view).  Sally Knyvette made being allowed to bring her dog to the studio a condition of playing Doctorman Allan.  Derren Nesbitt had a history of being cast in Doctor Who, having played villainous warlord Tegana in the 1964 First Doctor serial Marco Polo.  Nicholas Briggs has done a lot of work for Big Finish, most notably writing and voicing the Daleks for the Dalek Empire series.  He also provides most of the monster voices for the new TV series, including the Cybermen.

Reception and outside references
Reaction to Spare Parts has largely been very positive, and the story is often considered the definitive version of the origins of the Cybermen amongst fans.

In his introduction to Big Finish: The Inside Story, Russell T Davies called this story (along with The Holy Terror) "some of the finest drama ever written for any genre, in any medium, anywhere".  Consequently, it became the inspiration for one of the new TV series stories: the two-part story "Rise of the Cybermen"/"The Age of Steel" was inspired by this story, and that Marc Platt received a fee for the reused story elements; he was credited in the programme's end titles.  However, writer Tom MacRae noted that his television story was not a simple rewrite of Spare Parts: "My story isn't the same — it's got a different setting, different themes, and different characters, [because] once we started talking, the whole thing developed in a very different direction.  But as Russell says, we wouldn't have started this whole line of thinking if he hadn't heard Spare Parts in the first place."  Spare Parts takes place on the planet Mondas of the regular Doctor Who universe, rather than the parallel Earth of "Rise of the Cybermen", and the two stories feature two entirely separate races of Cybermen.

In the revived Series 10 finale "World Enough and Time"/"The Doctor Falls", the Twelfth Doctor and his companions encounter an alternate 'Genesis of the Cybermen', as it is described by The Master, on board a colony ship that originated from Mondas. The Doctor however, corrects the Master by describing the Cybermen as an example of 'parallel evolution', mentioning several planets of origin of the Cybermen, including Mondas.

Briggs reprised the role of Zheng for the character’s cameo in the Sixth Doctor audio drama The Reaping.

References

Sources
Doctor Who: Spare Parts (audio drama)
Ian Farrington (Ed.) Doctor Who: The Audio Scripts – Volume Three, specifically:
Marc Platt, Spare Parts (script)
Marc Platt, Spare Parts (introduction)
Gary Russell, I Love Spare Parts (article)

External links
Big Finish Productions – Spare Parts

2002 audio plays
Fifth Doctor audio plays
Cybermen audio plays
Audio plays by Marc Platt